The men's 1 km time trial competition at the 2019 European Games was held at the Minsk Velodrome on 29 June 2019.

Results

Qualifying
The top 8 riders qualified for the final.

Final

References

Men's 1 km time trial